Mammillaria barbata Engelm. is a small cactus native to Chihuahua, Sonora, and Durango, with the common name greenflower nipple cactus. It is found in mountainous locations in the Sierra Madre Occidental. It has delicate white to pink flowers. The fruits are red and oblong. They are edible but too small to be of much food value to humans.

Synonyms
 'Mammillaria barbata' Engelm. in Wisliz., Memoir of a Tour to Northern Mexico: connected with Col. Doniphan's Expedition in 1846 and 1847 105–106. 1848. 
 Cactus barbatus (Engelm. in Wisliz.) Kuntze, Revis. Gen. Pl. 1: 260. 1891.
 Chilita barbata (Engelm. in Wisliz.) Orcutt, Cactography 2. 1926.
 Cochemiea barbata (Engelm. in Wisliz.) Doweld, Sukkulenty 3(1-2): 38. 2000.
 Ebnerella barbata (Engelm. in Wisliz.) Buxb., Oesterr. Bot. Z. 98: 89. 1951.
 Neomammillaria barbata (Engelm. in Wisliz.) Britton & Rose, Cactaceae (Britton & Rose) 4: 144, fig. 159. 1923.
 Mammillaria barbata var. garessii (Cowper) Lodé, Cact. Aventures 16: 17. 1992.
 Mammillaria garessii Cowper, Cact. Succ. J. (Los Angeles) 42: 14, 93. 1970.
 Mammillaria barbata var. morricalii (Cowper) Lodé, Cact. Aventures 16: 17. 1992.
 Mammillaria morricalii Cowper, Cact. Succ. J. (Los Angeles) 41: 208. 1969.
 Mammillaria barbata var. santaclarensis (Cowper) Lodé, Cact. Aventures 16: 17. 1992.
 Mammillaria santaclarensis Cowper, Cact. Succ. J. (Los Angeles) 41: 248. 1969.
 Mammillaria chavezei Cowper, Natl. Cact. Succ. J. xviii. 8. 1963 [invalid name]
 Mammillaria melilotiae Laferr., J. Mammillaria Soc. 38(2):18. 1998.
 Mammillaria luthieniae Laferr., J. Mammillaria Soc. 38(2):18. 1998.
 Mammillaria orestera L.D.Benson, Cacti Ariz. ed. 3, 22, 155. 1969.
 Mammillaria viridiflora (Britton & Rose) Boed., Mammillarien-Vergleichs-Schluessel 36. 1933.
 Chilita viridiflora (Britton & Rose) Orcutt, Cactography 2 1926.
 Mammillaria wilcoxii var. viridiflora (Britton & Rose) W.T.Marshall, Desert. Bot. Gard. Arizona, Sci. Bull. 1: 102. 1950
 Mammillaria wrightii var. viridiflora (Britton & Rose) W.T.Marshall, Desert. Bot. Gard. Arizona, Sci. Bull. 1: 102. 1950
 Neomammillaria viridiflora Britton & Rose, Cactaceae (Britton & Rose) 4: 153. 1923

References

barbata
Cacti of Mexico
Endemic flora of Mexico
Flora of the Chihuahuan Desert
Flora of Chihuahua (state)
Flora of Durango
Flora of Sonora
Taxa named by George Engelmann